Gemmula peraspera is an extinct species of sea snail, a marine gastropod mollusk in the family Turridae, the turrids.

Description

Distribution
Fossils of this marine species have been found in Tertiary strata in New Zealand.

References

 Marwick, J. (1931). The Tertiary Mollusca of the Gisborne District. New Zealand Geological Survey Paleontological Bulletin 13:1-177. 18: pls.
 Maxwell, P.A. (2009). Cenozoic Mollusca. pp 232–254 in Gordon, D.P. (ed.) New Zealand inventory of biodiversity. Volume one. Kingdom Animalia: Radiata, Lophotrochozoa, Deuterostomia. Canterbury University Press, Christchurch

peraspera
Gastropods described in 1931
Gastropods of New Zealand